Rgabi Ait Hassou is a small town in south Morocco in the Sahara Desert. It is 450 km south of Marrakesh. This area is inhabited by the Berber people who speak the Tamazight language.

Gallery

Populated places in Zagora Province
Kasbahs in Morocco